Leslie Greentree is a Canadian poet and writer.

Career 

Born in Grande Prairie, Alberta, Leslie was educated at the University of Lethbridge, from which she received Bachelor of Arts and Bachelor of Education degrees. Greentree resides in Edmonton, Alberta where she works for the St. Albert Public Library in St. Albert, Alberta, and does freelance work on the side.

Greentree's first book of poetry, guys named Bill came out in 2002 was quickly followed in 2003 by go-go dancing for Elvis. In 2004, she won the CBC Poetry Face-off for Calgary, and competed in the National Face-off. 

To date, she is most noted for her poetry collection go-go dancing for Elvis which shortlisted for the Griffin Poetry Prize in 2004.

Awards 

go-go dancing for Elvis was shortlisted for the Griffin Poetry Prize in 2004. In 2006, Greentree published her first collection of short stories, entitled A Minor Planet for You and won the Alberta Literary Awards Howard O'Hagan prize for best book of short fiction (2007).

Productions 

Oral Fixations, Greentree's first play, co-written with Blaine Newton, received its world premiere in October 2014. It was produced by Ignition Theatre in Red Deer, Alberta.

Bibliography

Poetry 
guys named Bill (Frontenac House, 2002)
go-go dancing for Elvis (Frontenac House, 2003)

Short fiction 
A Minor Planet for You (University of Alberta Press, 2006)

Plays 
Oral Fixations. 2014. [unpublished]

External links 
 Official website
 Biography at Griffin Poetry Prize 
 Leslie Greentree reading, including video clip at Griffin Poetry Prize 
 Poetry Canada magazine article

Living people
21st-century Canadian poets
Canadian women poets
People from Grande Prairie
University of Lethbridge alumni
Writers from Alberta
Canadian women short story writers
21st-century Canadian women writers
21st-century Canadian short story writers
Year of birth missing (living people)